Carmine Meo is the debut album by French soprano Emma Shapplin, released in December 1997. The album brought Shapplin worldwide attention, selling over two million copies  and being certified multi-platinum.

Track listing

Bonus tracks

Personnel
Yaël Benzaquen - Vocal Coach
Virginie Borgeaud - Management
Michel DeFolligne - Collaboration, Coordination
Chistopher Deschamps - Drums
Régis Dupré - Brass Conductor, Conductor, String Conductor
Vic Emerson - Artistic Director, Choir/Chorus, Orchestral Arrangements
Alix Ewald - Assistant Engineer, Engineer, Mixing Assistant
Patrice Kung - Mixing
Bertrand Lajudie - Piano
Carina Landehag - Make-Up
Jean Yves Legrand - Engineer
André Perriat - Mastering
Vincent Perrot - Bass
Emma Shapplin - Liner Notes, Primary Artist
Mariana Yotoya - Choir Conductor
Jean-Patrick Capdevielle - Songwriter

Charts

Weekly

Year-end

Certifications

References

External links 
 Official site
 
 http://www.allmusic.com/album/carmine-meo-mw0000465175/releases

Emma Shapplin albums
1997 debut albums
Italian-language albums